In Japan, the slang term , or  for short, emerged in the late 1990s. The term can literally be translated as "oops-we-did-it-marriage," implying an unintended pregnancy. Notable celebrities with these marriages include Namie Amuro, Yōko Oginome, Hitomi Furuya, Ami Suzuki, Kaori Iida, Nozomi Tsuji, Anna Tsuchiya, Meisa Kuroki, Leah Dizon, Melody Miyuki Ishikawa, Riisa Naka and Rie Miyazawa. A quarter of all Japanese brides are pregnant at the time of their wedding, according to the Health Labor and Welfare Ministry, and pregnancy is one of the most common motivations for marriage. The prevalence and celebrity profile of dekichatta-kon has inspired Japan's wedding industry to introduce an even more benign phrase, .

See also
 Shotgun wedding
 Forced marriage
 Knobstick wedding
 Premarital sex
 Oklahoma!, a play where one character, Ali Hakim, is forcibly coerced towards marriage on two occasions.
 Marriage of convenience

References

Marriage, unions and partnerships in Japan
Forced marriage